Sociedad Deportiva Hullera Vasco-Leonesa was a football team based in Ciñera, town belonging to La Pola de Gordón municipality in the autonomous community of Castile and León. Founded in 1950, it last played in the Primera Provincial de León. Its stadium was Polideportivo Santa Bárbara, with a capacity of 2,600 seats.

The club ceased its activity in 2013.

Club background

CD Hullera (1950–1999)
SD Hullera Vasco-Leonesa (1999–2013)

Season to season

1 season in Segunda División B
32 seasons in Tercera División

External links
elportaldelfutbol.es.tl profile
futbolme.com profile

Football clubs in Castile and León
Association football clubs established in 1950
Divisiones Regionales de Fútbol clubs
1950 establishments in Spain
Province of León